Tetrafylia is a former municipality in the Arta regional unit, Epirus, Greece. Since the 2011 local government reform it is part of the municipality Georgios Karaiskakis, of which it is a municipal unit. The municipal unit has an area of 159.823 km2. Population 2,254 (2011). The seat of the municipality was in Astrochori.

References

Populated places in Arta (regional unit)